Something Like Love is a 1968 Italian drama film directed by Enzo Muzii. It was entered into the 18th Berlin International Film Festival where it won the Silver Bear Extraordinary Prize of the Jury.

Cast
 Alfred Lynch
 Anna Maria Guarnieri
 Giuseppe Salierno
 Valentino Esposito
 Paul Theodore Flynn
 Valentino Macchi
 Giulio Mascoli
 Gioia Ramaglia
 Barbara Ruffo

References

External links

1968 films
1960s Italian-language films
1968 drama films
Italian black-and-white films
Silver Bear Grand Jury Prize winners
1960s Italian films